Curtis Alexander may refer to:

 Curtis Alexander (Dream Team), a footballer on the fictional footballing drama Dream Team
 Curtis Alexander (American football) (born 1974), former American football player
Curt Alexander, screenwriter on The Bartered Bride (1932 film)

See also

Alexander Curtis (disambiguation)